Olúfẹ́mi Táíwò (born 1956) is a philosopher and professor at Cornell University.

Works

References

People from Ibadan
Nigerian emigrants to the United States
Nigerian philosophers
Cornell University faculty
Living people
1956 births